The Kill Point is an American television series that follows a group of U.S. Marines recently returned from serving in Iraq as they come together to pull off a major bank heist of a Three Rivers Bank branch in Pittsburgh. The series, produced by Mandeville Films and Lionsgate Television, is the first drama for the Spike TV network. The film of the series had the working title The Kill Pitt.

Most of the filming takes place in Market Square in downtown Pittsburgh while most of the sound stage filming takes place in a warehouse in Lawrenceville, a section of Pittsburgh.

A first-person shooter game based on the show is available online from Kuma Reality Games.

Synopsis
Jake "Mr. Wolf" Mendez, an ex-Sergeant in the Marine Corps and his men, all former members of the "10-13", a military platoon that participated in combat operations in Iraq and Afghanistan, enter a bank and rob it. Outside, on their way to the getaway car, they are shot at by vigilante, law enforcement, and private security personnel. Forced to retreat back into the bank when the getaway driver is wounded and their vehicle disabled, they take the bank customers hostage. Hostage negotiator Captain Horst Cali, attempts to end the stand off while elements of the "10-13" outside the bank and the father of one of the hostages work to help Mr. Wolf and his team escape.

Cast

Main
 Donnie Wahlberg as Captain Horst Cali, an experienced police negotiator
 John Leguizamo as Sergeant Jake Mendez / Mr. Wolf, the former leader of a Marine Corps platoon, now leading the platoon members in the robbery
 Michael Hyatt as Lieutenant Connie Reubens, the commander of the SWAT team
 Frank Grillo as Albert Roman / Mr. Pig, a flirtatious member of the platoon and Rabbit's brother
 Jeremy Davidson as Corporal Henry Roman / Mr. Rabbit, a violent and unstable platoon member and Pig's brother
 J.D. Williams as Marshall O'Brien, Jr. / Mr. Cat, the combat medic of the platoon
 Leo Fitzpatrick as Michael / Mr. Mouse, a platoon member afflicted with posttraumatic stress disorder, which becomes exacerbated by a gunshot wound he suffers
 Geoffrey Cantor as Abe Sheldon, the manager of Three Rivers Bank
 Christine Evangelista as Ashley Beck, the daughter of business mogul Alan Beck
 Adam Cantor as Rocko, an electrician for Three Rivers Bank and former convict
 Wayne Kasserman as Tonray, the technician of the police negotiation team
 Michael McGlone as Deputy Chief Nolan Abrami, Cali's superior
 Jennifer Ferrin as Chloe, a widowed young woman who develops Stockholm syndrome
 Steve Cirbus as Corporal Deke Quinlan, the platoon's getaway driver who assists the team from the outside after he escapes by himself
 Peter Appel as Teddy Sabian, the widowed father of Robby
 Michael Hogan as Hawk, a member of the SWAT team responsible for breaches
 Dana Ashbrook as Tony, a bank employee having a sexual affair with Renee

Recurring
 Tobin Bell as Alan Beck, a wealthy real estate mogul and the father of Ashley
 Michael K. Williams as Q, the SWAT team's sniper
 Bingo O'Malley as Bernard, an elderly homosexual bank patron
 Ethan Rosenfeld as Robby Sabian, Teddy's teenage son and computer expert
 Ryan Sands as Leroy Barnes, a defense attorney
 Kate Rogal as Marykim, a friend of Ashley's
 Brandi Engel as Cass Conferth, Ashley's friend
 Karen Baum as Karen, a bank teller
 Stefanie E. Frame as Renee, a bank employee in a sexual relationship with Tony
 Brandon Stacy Williams as Augie, a member of the SWAT breach team and friend of Hawk
 Jeff Hochendoner as Big Stan, a former member of Wolf's platoon
 Joshua Elijah Reese as Derzius, one of the former members of Wolf's platoon
 Nick Koesters as Leon, a former member of Wolf's platoon who lost his arm in combat
 Patrick Jordan as Johnny, Q's spotter

Guest
 Susan Misner as Lorna Ash, an FBI agent assigned to replace Cali as negotiator
 Patrica Cray as Addie, a teller at Three Rivers Bank
 Karen Carbone as Kerry Southwell, an FBI agent present at the bank during the robbery
 Adam Kroloff as Henry, a bank security guard
 John Hawkinson as Zing, a SWAT breach team member
 Laurel Brooke Johnson as Lucy Cali, Cali's pregnant wife
 Patrick Sebes as Luke Mendez, Wolf's heroin-addicted son

Episodes

Crew
The series was executive produced by James DeMonaco, David Hoberman, Todd Lieberman and Steve Shill. DeMonaco has dealt with hostage situations before in his script for The Negotiator. Directors include cable regular Steve Shill who the network hoped would help to establish their reputation for drama.

Critical response
Critics have characterised the show as familiar but watchable. Comparisons have been drawn to 1970s bank heist movies, Tarantino, The Nine and 24. Comparisons to The Nine have been favourable on the grounds that The Kill Point always has an ending in sight. Mr. Wolf's speeches to the crowd has been called "an Attica moment" and compared to Dog Day Afternoon.

The characters have been described as cliché by reviewers. However, the script has drawn praise for its subtlety and entertainment value. One reviewer felt that the running time allowed the clichéd characters to be developed in more interesting directions.

The casting of the show has drawn particular praise. Reviewers have noted the cast members who have also worked on The Wire including Michael K. Williams, JD Williams, Leo Fitzpatrick and Michael Hyatt. The chemistry of the opposing roles of negotiator and hostage taker also drew praise for John Leguizamo and Donnie Wahlberg as well as a surprising performance by Jeremy Davidson an unknown whose portrayal of a disturbed war veteran was very under-rated. The Pittsburgh Post-Gazette praised local actor Bingo O'Malley.

Webisodes
Five webisodes featuring Steve Cirbus as Deke and Joshua Elijah Reese as Derzius were made available via Spike TV's website. They cover the activities of Deke and Derzius of 10/13 platoon outside the bank as they work to aid Mendez and company. The webisodes were written and directed by Josh Trank.

Cancellation
Despite healthy ratings and attaining the target demographic of male viewers, Spike decided not to renew the series for a second season.

Home media
The series was released on DVD in the United Kingdom in 2008.

References

External links
Overview of Killpoint: "Everything About The Kill Point Series"
Pittsburgh Post-Gazette: "Killing time as an extra at 'Kill Point'"
Tribune-Review: "TV series 'Kill Point' films in Downtown

Official Site of The Kill Point Video Game

2000s American crime drama television series
2007 American television series debuts
2007 American television series endings
Bank robbery in fiction
Fictional portrayals of the Pittsburgh Bureau of Police
Hostage taking in fiction
Iraq War in television
Spike (TV network) original programming
Television series by Lionsgate Television
Television series created by James DeMonaco
Television shows about the United States Marine Corps
Television shows adapted into video games
Television shows filmed in Pittsburgh
Television shows set in Pittsburgh